Tol (or Tolköy) is a small village in Mersin Province, Turkey. It is a part of Mezitli district which is an intracity district of Greater Mersin. It is situated between a creek and a high hill in the Toros Mountains. It is one of the least populated villages of the province with a population of only  120 as of 2012.

References

Villages in Mezitli District